The following is a list of notable deaths in May 2000.

Entries for each day are listed alphabetically by surname. A typical entry lists information in the following sequence:
 Name, age, country of citizenship at birth, subsequent country of citizenship (if applicable), reason for notability, cause of death (if known), and reference.

May 2000

1
John Emery, 84, British paediatric pathologist.
Gil Fates, 85, American television producer.
David J. Mahoney, 76, American businessman and philanthropist, heart disease.
Gibby Mbasela, 37, Zambian footballer.
Steve Reeves, 74, American actor.
Nora Swinburne, 97, British actress.
Jukka Tapanimäki, 38, Finnish game programmer, heart failure.
Gérard Théberge, 69, Canadian Olympic ice hockey player, bronze medalist (1956)

2
Belva Cottier, 79, American Sioux activist and social worker.
Bob Homme, 81, American-Canadian television actor, known for his role as The Friendly Giant.
Bobbi Martin, 56, American country  and pop music singer, songwriter, and guitarist, cancer.
Billy Munn, 88, British jazz pianist.
Harry Newman, 90, American football player.
Sundar Popo, 56, Trinidadian and Tobagonian musician.
Christina Marie Riggs, 28, American convicted murderer, execution by lethal injection.
Teri Thornton, 65, American jazz singer, bladder cancer.

3
Lewis Allen, 94, British film and television director.
Ed Chapman, 94, American baseball player.
Claudio Forrosuelo, Philippine Army trooper and  posthumous recipient of the Medal of Valor, K.I.A.
William Keys, 77, Australian Army officer.
Bryan Lobb, 69, first-class cricketer.
John Joseph O'Connor, 80, American Roman Catholic prelate.
Edward J. Sponga, 82, American Jesuit priest in the Society of Jesus.

4
Sir Derick Ashe, 81, British diplomat.
Hendrik Casimir, 90, Dutch physicist known for the Casimir effect.
Alwyn Kurts, 84, Australian drama and comedy actor, liver failure.
Kieran Nugent, Provisional Irish Republican Army volunteer.
Sugi Sito, 73, Mexican wrestler known as El Orgullo de Oriente.

5
Edward Ashley-Cooper, 93, Australian actor, congestive heart failure.
Gino Bartali, 85, Italian racing cyclist.
Don Kindt, 74, American football player.
Rolf Magener, 89, German escapee from India during World War II.
Bill Musselman, 59, American basketball coach, stroke.

6
Benoy Choudhury, Indian freedom fighter and politician.
Juan de Dios Guevara, 90, Peruvian chemist.
Mary Percy Jackson, 95, British-born Canadian medical practitioner.
Gordon McClymont, 79, Australian agricultural scientist and ecologist.
John Clive Ward, 75, British-Australian physicist, respiratory illness.
Sir Peter William Youens, 84, British diplomat and colonial administrator, pneumonia.

7
Dov Bar-Nir, 88, Belgium-born Israeli politician.
Douglas Fairbanks Jr., 90, American actor and the son of Douglas Fairbanks.
Henry Laskau, 83, American Olympic racewalker.
José Luis López de Lacalle, Spanish journalist and trade unionist, killed by the ETA.
Masaru Shintani, 72, Japanese-Canadian master of karate, heart attack.
Homer Thompson, 93, Canadian classical archaeologist.

8
Pita Amor, 81, Mexican poet.
Stanley Boxer, 73, American abstract artist.
X Brands, 72, German-American actor.
Dédé Fortin, 37, Canadian musician, suicide.
Hubert Maga, 83, Dahomey politician.
Henry Nicols, 26, American HIV/AIDS activist.

9
Arthur Davis, 94, American animator and a director.
Chris Evans, 53, Canadian ice hockey player.
Leland S. McClung, 89, American bacteriologist.
Carmen Romano, 74, First Lady of Mexico (1976-1982).

10
Sir Martin Farndale, 71, British army general.
Bill Foster, 68, American entertainer.
Carden Gillenwater, 82, American baseball player.
Margaret Harris, 95, British costume designer.
Kiyoshi Kuromiya, 57, Japanese-American author and civil rights activist, cancer.
Kaneto Shiozawa, 46, Japanese voice actor.
Craig Stevens, 81, American actor.

11
Verna Aardema, 88, American writer.
Dale Jennings, 82, American LGBT rights activist, playwright and author.
René Muñoz, 62, Cuban actor, screenwriter of telenovelas and the cinema of Mexico.
Hanny Thalmann, 83, Swiss women's rights activist and politician.
Paula Wessely, 93, Austrian actress.

12
Pete Abele, 83, American politician (U.S. Representative for Ohio's 10th congressional district, Alzheimer's disease.
Steve Belko, 84, American college basketball coach.
Dymphna Clark, 83, Australian linguist and educator.
Dong Kingman, 89, Chinese American artist and watercolor master.
Adam Petty, 19, American race car driver, car crash.

13
Paul Bartel, 61, American actor, writer and director.
Olivier Greif, 50, French composer.
Boško Perošević, 43, Serbian politician.
Jumbo Tsuruta, 49, Japanese professional wrestler known as Jumbo Tsuruta, complications from liver transplant.
Cesare Valletti, 77, Italian operatic tenor.

14
Garrett Eckbo, 89, American landscape architect.
Abbas Gharabaghi, 81, Iranian Army officer and Chief of Staff.
Johnny Cook, 51, American gospel singer formerly of the Happy Goodman Family.
Sarah Mavis Dabbs, 78, All-American Girls Professional Baseball League player.
Abbas Gharabaghi, 81, Iranian Army officer and Chief of Staff.
Bob Maza, 60, Australian actor and playwright.
Keizō Obuchi, 62, Japanese politician and Prime Minister.
Karl Shapiro, 86, American poet.
Nina Howell Starr, 97, American photographer, art historian, and art dealer.
Alex Stuart-Menteth, 87, British Royal Navy officer.

15
Roberto Benedicto, 83, Filipino lawyer, diplomat and banker.
Geoff Goddard, 62, English songwriter, singer and instrumentalist, heart attack.
George Marshall, 96, American conservationist and political activist.
Gösta Prüzelius, 77, Swedish actor.
Anthony Squire, 86, British screenwriter and director.

16
Bodacious, "World's Most Dangerous Bull" World Champion title holder.
Alexander Nadas, 86, Hungarian-American pediatric cardiologist.
Ghulam Ali Okarvi, 80, Pakistani Islamic scholar and jurist.
Andrzej Szczypiorski, 72, Polish novelist and politician.
Jack "Basher" Williams, 82, Australian rules footballer.
Ronald Jay Williams, 72, Trinidadian businessman and politician.

17
Yola Cain, Jamaican pilot and flight instructor, breast cancer.
Kanwar Durga Chand, Indian politician.
Donald Coggan, 90, English Anglican and 101st Archbishop of Canterbury.
William H. Poteat, 81, American philosopher, scholar and professor.
Sajjan, 79, Indian actor.

18
Julie Dawn, 79, English singer and radio broadcaster.
Denis Gifford, 72, British writer, broadcaster and journalist.
Alfred L. Jenkins, 83, American diplomat, lecturer and author.
Doyle Lade, 79, American baseball player.
Muhammad Yusuf Ludhianvi, 67/68, Pakistani Muslim scholar, author and muhaddith, murdered.

19
Lee Brewster, 57, American drag queen and transvestite activist, cancer.
John Grigas, 79, American football player.
Yevgeny Khrunov, 66, Soviet cosmonaut, heart attack.
Sir Larry Lamb, 70, British newspaper editor.
Emily Wheelock Reed, American librarian and civil rights activist.

20
Edward Bernds, 94, American director.
Dick Brown, 74, Canadian football player.
Jean-Pierre Rampal, 78, French flautist.
Malik Sealy, 30, American basketball player.

21
Dame Barbara Cartland, 98, English novelist.
Sir John Gielgud, 96, English actor.
Dulcie Holland, 87, Australian composer and music educator.
Mark R. Hughes, 44, American entrepreneur and founder of Herbalife, accidental overdose.
Erich Mielke, 92, German communist official.
Zhao Puchu, 92, Chinese religious leader and calligrapher.
Mahmoud Zuabi, Syrian politician and Prime Minister, suicide (disputed).

22
Bahadoor, Indian actor.
Krzysztof Boruń, 76, Polish physicist, journalist and science fiction writer.
Eldridge Dickey, 54, American football player, stroke.
Davie Fulton, 84, Canadian politician and judge.
Richard P. Keirn, 75, United States Air Force Colonel and fighter pilot.
Gary Kerkorian, 70, American football player.
Bennie Lee Sinclair, 61, American poet, novelist, and short story writer, heart attack.
David Chadwick Smith, 68, Canadian economist.

23
Eddy Blondeel, 94, Belgian commander of the SAS during WWII.
Roger Garrett, 59, American actor.
Mishari bin Abdulaziz Al Saud, Saudi prince as member of the House of Saud.

24
Kevin Lyons, 77, Australian politician.
Kurt Schork, 53, American reporter and war correspondent.
Majrooh Sultanpuri, 80, Indian poet.
Cliff Sutter, 89, American tennis player.
Oleg Yefremov, 72, Soviet/Russian actor and theatre producer.

25
Ken Bousfield, 80, British golfer.
Nicholas Clay, 53, British actor.
Seymour S. Kety, 84, American neuroscientist.
Francis Lederer, 100, Austrian-born actor in Europe and United States.
Jaya Pathirana, 79, Sri Lankan Supreme Court justice.

26
Hamp Pool, 85, American football player, coach and scout, heart failure.
Samuel A. Taylor, 87, American playwright and screenwriter, heart failure.
Vernon Crompton Woodward, 83, Canadian fighter pilot and flying ace during World War II.
So Yamamura, 90, Japanese actor and film director.

27
Gonzalo, Duke of Aquitaine, 62, Spanish aristocrat,.
Murray MacLehose, Baron MacLehose of Beoch, 82, British diplomat, Governor of Hong Kong.
Maurice Richard, 78, Canadian hockey player.
Kazimierz Leski, 87, Polish engineer, fighter pilot, and (counter-)intelligence officer.
Jane Stoll, 71, All-American Girls Professional Baseball League player.

28
George Irving Bell, 73, American scientist and mountaineer.
Donald Davies, 75, Welsh computer scientist.
Maraden Panggabean, 77, Indonesian Army general and Defense Minister.
Vincentas Sladkevičius, 79, Lithuanian Cardinal of the Roman Catholic Church.
Eric Turner, 31, American football player, stomach cancer.

29
Clement Isong, 80, Nigerian banker and politician.
Robert T. Oliver, 90, American author and lecturer.
Aubrey Richards, 79, British actor.
John Westhead, 34, English rugby footballer, blood loss after smashing window.

30
Tex Beneke, 86, American bandleader and musician (Glenn Miller Orchestra).
Iko Carreira, 66, Angolan army general and politician.
Bob Casey Sr., 68, American lawyer and politician, viral infection.
Doris Hare, 95, Welsh actress.

31
John Coolidge, 93, son of American President Calvin Coolidge.
Petar Mladenov, 63, Bulgarian communist diplomat and politician.
Nikolaos Oikonomides, 66, Greek Byzantantist.
Tito Puente, 77, American musician, songwriter ("Oye Como Va") and record producer.
Hank Ruszkowski, 74, American baseball player.
Johnnie Taylor, 66, American singer.

References 

2000-05
 05